Matty Maggiacomo is a fitness instructor with Peloton and Peloton's Director of Fitness Programming.
Prior to joining Peloton in 2018, he was a founding instructor at Barry's Bootcamp.

Maggiacomo is originally from Rhode Island and was working in journalism prior to pivoting to a career in fitness. He is a member of the LGBTQ+ community.

References

Living people
Year of birth missing (living people)
Peloton instructors